Murray James Cook, AM (born 30 June 1960) is an Australian musician, actor, and Disc jockey (DJ). Cook was one of the founding members of the children's band the Wiggles from 1991 to 2012. Cook provided guitar, vocals, and songwriting in the group, and remained involved with its creative and production aspects after his retirement. In 2013, Cook served as the Wiggles' tour manager.  He also remained active in many music projects, including, after 2015, writing and performing with the Sydney soul-rock band The Soul Movers.

In July 2020, Cook brought the original members of The Wiggles back together to create a disco-infused workout track for the Soul Movers "Circles Baby" (ABC Music) designed to lift the spirits of a nation.

Career

Early musical projects
Cook played the guitar in the late 1980s bands the Transistors and Finger Guns before joining the Sydney-based band Bang Shang a Lang.  (He continued to play for Bang Shang a Lang in Sydney, when not on tour with the Wiggles.)

The Wiggles
After "a career as a struggling musician in Sydney", Cook returned to university and studied early childhood education at Macquarie University, where he met Anthony Field and Greg Page and formed the Wiggles in 1991.  Cook worked as a preschool teacher for two years before the success of the Wiggles forced him to quit.  According to Field, Cook would have been content to "continue teaching and perhaps move into an academic role in the field.  He knows his stuff and is simply great with children".

Cook was conscious that he was probably the first guitarist children would see, and said, "I always think that if it inspires kids to play guitar later on that would be great. I think it would be really nice if in 15 years I read that somebody got into guitar playing because of [The] Wiggles".  Guitar Magazine speculated that since Cook was one of the first guitarists children were exposed to, he might be the most influential guitarist in the world.  Cook's major musical influences were the Beatles, the Rolling Stones, the Who, and Eric Clapton.  In 2007, Cook owned a collection of thirty vintage guitars.

As a member of the Wiggles, Cook wore a red skivvy and served as an instrumentalist and vocalist.  He came up with the Wiggles' signature index finger-wagging move after watching professional ten pin bowlers do the move on television.  He was considered the intellectual and analytical member of the group (something referred to in several episodes of their TV show), so he acted as mediator for their group decisions.  When the Wiggles received honorary degrees from the Australian Catholic University in 2006, Cook gave the commencement speech to the graduates.

On 17 May 2012, it was announced that Cook, along with Greg Page and Jeff Fatt, would be retiring from the Wiggles at the end of the year.  He was replaced by Wiggles cast member Simon Pryce.  Cook and the others expected to remain involved with the creative and production aspects of the group.  In 2013, Cook served as the group's tour manager.

After the Wiggles
Cook told the Newcastle Herald, about his music career after his retirement from the Wiggles, "I was kind of feeling my way for a few years, I guess".  In addition to continuing to play with Bang Shang A Lang, he "began to explore other adult musical projects". He performed lead guitar for the Proposition, "a Sydney-based guitar pop band fronted by singer-songwriter Luke Russell" on their 2015 album, Edge of the Dancefloor.  Also in 2015, Cook was involved in the production of the play Sons of Sun, which was about American music producer Sam Phillips.  In October 2017, Cook played guitar for the tribute show "The Nancy Sinatra/Lee Hazlewood Experience" with Zoe Carides and Scott Holmes in Newcastle, New South Wales.

While exploring other projects, Cook met Lizzie Mack, a member of the Sydney soul-rock band the Soul Movers, who along with Radio Birdman guitarist Deniz Tek and founder of The Soul Movers, were relaunching the group. In 2015, Cook began writing songs with Mack and decided to focus on the band and use it as his "main creative outlet"  In 2017, the group recorded Testify, "an album of energetic blues, soul and rock".  The album was recorded at the Wiggles' studio in northwest Sydney and Jeff Fatt performed keyboards for the group.  In 2019, the group recorded Bona Fide, which the Sydney Morning Herald called "a stunning album".  The album, which as Cook stated, included "more roots-oriented songs to try to reflect a wide range of American music styles", and was recorded in the U.S.' "premier soul studios" such as Sun Studios in Memphis, Tennessee, and FAME Studios in Muscle Shoals, Alabama.

In early 2018, Cook gave an "energetic performance" in the music video for the DZ Deathrays song, "Like People", which went viral online.  He appeared with the group at the rock festival Splendour in the Grass in July 2018.

The Soul Movers album "Bona Fide" was recorded across legendary studios in North America including Royal and Sun Studios in Memphis and Fame and Muscle Shoals Sound in Alabama (ABC Music 2019) has been nominated for best Soul/R&B album of 2019 in the AIR Awards. The Soul Movers play rescheduled music festival Splendour in the Grass in 2021. (Previous albums "Testify!" and "Evolution" were released in October 2020 (ABC Music)).

Personal life
Cook's nickname is "Muzz".  He is married to Meg Munro and has two children, a son and a daughter, wheelchair basketball player Georgia Munro-Cook.  In 2018, he told the Newcastle Herald, "I'm a big fan of music in general and go to see lots of bands".

Cook, along with the other three original members of the Wiggles, was made a Member of the Order of Australia in 2010 "for service to the arts, particularly children's entertainment, and to the community as benefactors and supporters of a range of charities".  In 2015, he was one of the members of the Australian jury for the Junior Eurovision Song Contest.

On 30 November 2020, 11 months after fellow former founding bandmate Greg Page collapsed on stage at a bushfire relief concert and went into cardiac arrest, Cook opened up about a major health scare which forced him to undergo open heart surgery.

References

External links
 Bang Shang a Lang
 The Soul Movers

Bibliography
 Field, Anthony and Greg Truman. (2012). How I Got My Wiggle Back: A Memoir of Healing. Hoboken, New Jersey: John Wiley & Sons. .

1960 births
APRA Award winners
Living people
People educated at Orange High School (New South Wales)
Members of the Order of Australia
People from Cowra
The Wiggles members
Australian male singers
Australian children's musicians
Australian songwriters
Australian rock guitarists
Macquarie University alumni
Lead guitarists
People from Orange, New South Wales
Australian male guitarists